Kakadlé F.C. is a Togolese football club based in Niamtougou. They play in the top division in Togolese football. Their home stadium is Stade Municipal.

Football clubs in Togo